The Thompson River is a tributary of the south shore of De Montigny Lake, flowing in the town of Val-d'Or, in the La Vallée-de-l'Or Regional County Municipality, in the administrative region of Abitibi-Témiscamingue, in Quebec, in Canada.

Recreational tourism is the sector's primary economic activity, including pleasure boating on De Montigny lakes, Blouin and Lemoine Lake. This strait includes a marina. (at south of the strait) and a seaplane base (in the middle of the strait). In addition, a railway bridge and a road bridge cross this strait which is located on the west side of the city of Val-d'Or.

The surface of the Thompson River is generally frozen from mid-December to mid-April.

Geography 
The neighboring watersheds of the Thompson River are:
 north side: Harricana River, Lac De Montigny, Milky River;
 east side: Sabourin Lake, Marrias River, Sabourin River;
 south side: Lemoine lake, Mourier Lake;
 west side: Piché River, Fournière Lake.

The source of the Thompson River is located at the mouth of Lemoine Lake (Val-d'Or) which is mainly fed by a strait (from the southwest) connecting it to Mourier Lake.

From its source, the Thompson River flows  northward forming a navigable strait and collects the waters of the Piché River (coming from the west).

The Thompson River flows on the south shore of Lac De Montigny to:
  south-east of the outlet of the Harricana River in Malartic Lake;
  south of the mouth of Lac De Montigny;
  west of downtown Val-d'Or;
  north-east of Lac Fournière;
  north of the hamlet of Rivière-Thompson.

Toponymy 

The toponym Thompson river was formalized on December 21, 1982 at the Commission de toponymie du Québec.

See also 

 James Bay, a body of water
 List of rivers of Quebec

Notes and references 

Rivers of Abitibi-Témiscamingue